The 1943 Philadelphia Athletics season involved the A's finishing eighth in the American League with a record of 49 wins and 105 losses.

Offseason 
 November 2, 1942: Johnny Welaj was drafted by the Athletics from the Detroit Tigers in the 1942 rule 5 draft.

Regular season

Season standings

Record vs. opponents

Notable transactions 
 April 14, 1943: Dave Odom was released by the Athletics.

Roster

Player stats

Batting

Starters by position 
Note: Pos = Position; G = Games played; AB = At bats; H = Hits; Avg. = Batting average; HR = Home runs; RBI = Runs batted in

Other batters 
Note: G = Games played; AB = At bats; H = Hits; Avg. = Batting average; HR = Home runs; RBI = Runs batted in

Pitching

Starting pitchers 
Note: G = Games pitched; IP = Innings pitched; W = Wins; L = Losses; ERA = Earned run average; SO = Strikeouts

Other pitchers 
Note: G = Games pitched; IP = Innings pitched; W = Wins; L = Losses; ERA = Earned run average; SO = Strikeouts

Relief pitchers 
Note: G = Games pitched; W = Wins; L = Losses; SV = Saves; ERA = Earned run average; SO = Strikeouts

Farm system 

LEAGUE CHAMPIONS: Elmira

References

External links
1943 Philadelphia Athletics team page at Baseball Reference
1943 Philadelphia Athletics team page at www.baseball-almanac.com

Oakland Athletics seasons
Philadelphia Athletics season
Oakland